Craugastor daryi is a species of frog in the family Craugastoridae.
It is endemic to Guatemala.
Its natural habitats are subtropical or tropical moist montane forests, rivers, and intermittent rivers.
It is threatened by habitat loss.

References

daryi
Endemic fauna of Guatemala
Amphibians of Guatemala
Amphibians described in 1984
Taxonomy articles created by Polbot